St. Johnny were a Connecticut-based rock band, formed in 1989 and split c.1995.  They were signed to DGC Records.

Members

Bill Whitten 1989-1995 (vocals, guitar)
Tom Leonard 1989-1993 (guitar)
Jim Elliot 1989-1995 (bass) Died 2016
Wayne Letitia 1989-1994 (drums)
Sean Mackowiak 1989-1990 (guitar)
"Lucky" Jim Roberto 1993-1995 (guitar)
Tom Goss 1994-1995 (drums)

Discography

Singles & EPs
Four Songs (7") (Asthma Record) 1992
Go To Sleep (7″) (Ajax Records) 1992
A Car or A Boy (7″) (DGC) 1993
Gilligan/Live at the Sports Page Cafe… (7″) (Twisted Village) 1994
I Give Up/One Of The Boys (7″) (Love Kit) 1994
Scuba Diving/Welcome Back Kotter (7″) (DGC)

Full-Length
High As A Kite (Rough Trade(UK)/Caroline(US)) 1993
Speed Is Dreaming (DGC) 1994
Let It Come Down (DGC) 1995

Tracks Appear On
“Ashes and Slashes” My Companion Turn of the Century (LP) 1990
“Wild Goose Chasing” DGC Rarities: Vol.1 (CD) (Geffen Records) 1994
“Scuba Diving” Buy-Product (CD, Comp) (Geffen Records) 1995
“Scuba Diving” CMJ New Music April – Volume 20 (CD, Promo) (College Music   Journal) 1995
Incredible Son of Swag (CD) (Geffen/DGC) 1995

References

External links
Trouserpress entry for St. Johnny
[ St. Johnny at AMG]

Musical groups established in 1989
Musical groups disestablished in 1995
Alternative rock groups from Connecticut
Musical groups from Hartford, Connecticut